Chom Bueng is a district (amphoe) of Ratchaburi province in western Thailand.

Geography

Neighboring districts are (from the north clockwise): Dan Makham Tia and Tha Muang of Kanchanaburi province; and Photharam, Mueang Ratchaburi, Pak Tho, Ban Kha, and Suan Phueng of Ratchaburi Province.

Several caves are found in the district. Khao Bin cave is regarded as the most beautiful, having many stalactites and stalagmites and a "holy" pond. The cave is named after a rock formation which looks like a flying bird. Chomphon cave was renamed by King Chulalongkorn during his visit in the area in 1895, due to a stalactite that resembled an epaulette of a field marshal.

History
In 1895 King Chulalongkorn and Queen Saovabha visited Ratchaburi province, including the district. The king saw a large lake there. He then renamed the area big lake or chom bueng, and made it a minor district (king amphoe). 

In 1958 Chom Bueng was upgraded to Chom Bueng District.

Administration

Central administration 
Chom Bueng is divided into six sub-districts (tambons), which are further subdivided into 90 administrative villages (mubans).

Local administration 
There are two sub-district municipalities (thesaban tambons) in the district:
 Chom Bueng consisting of parts of sub-district Chom Bueng.
 Dan Thap Tako consisting of parts of sub-district Dan Thap Tako.

There are six sub-district administrative organizations (SAO) in the district:
 Chom Bueng consisting of parts of sub-district Chom Bueng.
 Pak Chong consisting of sub-district Pak Chong.
 Boek Phrai consisting of sub-district Boek Phrai.
 Dan Thap Tako consisting of parts of sub-district Dan Thap Tako.
 Kaem On consisting of sub-district Kaem On.
 Rang Bua consisting of sub-district Rang Bua.

References

Chom Bueng